Augustus Daniel "Gus" Kearney (22 November 1870 – 10 March 1907) was an Australian rules footballer who played for the Essendon Football Club in the Victorian Football League (VFL), and was a part of the Bombers' 1897 premiership team.

Football
Kearney came from Geelong College and played in three of the Essendon Association's premierships between 1892 and 1894. Kearney was a skilled follower who played intercolonial football in 1893.

Kearney was the vice-captain of Essendon in his two playing years for the club in the Victorian Football League, 1897 and 1898.

Tennis
He also excelled at tennis, winning the New South Wales Open twice and Victorian Singles title six times.

Death
Kearney died at the age of 36, on 10 March 1907, after a nasal operation.

Legacy
The Dr Gus Kearney Memorial Prize is still presented annually by Geelong College, to one boy in recognition of "all-round ability and service to the College".

The Prize "was first awarded in 1908 in memory of Dr 'Gus' Kearney, an outstanding sportsman and former captain of the School who died at the young age of thirty-six years in March, 1907. The award was provided by the Old Collegians' Association. In 1908, Norman Morrison described the award 'to be awarded annually on the lines of the Rhodes Scholarships, for proficiency in school work, combined with prowess in athletic sports'."

Notes

References
 'Follower', "The Footballers' Alphabet", The Leader, (Saturday, 23 July 1898), p.17.
 Maplestone, M., Flying Higher: History of the Essendon Football Club 1872–1996, Essendon Football Club, (Melbourne), 1996. 

1870 births
Australian rules footballers from Victoria (Australia)
Essendon Football Club players
Essendon Football Club Premiership players
Australian male tennis players
1907 deaths
People educated at Geelong College
Tennis people from Victoria (Australia)
One-time VFL/AFL Premiership players